Roger Dion (born 20 April 1938) is a Canadian gymnast. He competed in eight events at the 1968 Summer Olympics.

References

1938 births
Living people
Canadian male artistic gymnasts
Olympic gymnasts of Canada
Gymnasts at the 1968 Summer Olympics
Sportspeople from Quebec City
Pan American Games medalists in gymnastics
Pan American Games silver medalists for Canada
Pan American Games bronze medalists for Canada
Gymnasts at the 1963 Pan American Games
Gymnasts at the 1967 Pan American Games
Medalists at the 1963 Pan American Games
Medalists at the 1967 Pan American Games
21st-century Canadian people
20th-century Canadian people